Scott Homer Drew (born October 23, 1970) is an American college basketball coach who is the head coach of the Baylor Bears, a position he has held since 2003.

Drew began his coaching career as an assistant for Valparaiso under his father Homer Drew. Following his father's retirement in 2002, Drew would serve as the head coach of Valparaiso for one season before being hired by Baylor in 2003. Drew took over Baylor as a program in ruins, following decades of mediocre-to-poor performance and a public scandal that resulted in numerous NCAA sanctions. After four seasons rebuilding the program, Drew turned Baylor from a program with only one NCAA tournament appearance since 1950 into a perennial tournament contender appearing in 10 of 13 tournaments since 2008. In 2021, Drew would lead Baylor to a Big 12 championship, 28–2 record and their first ever NCAA championship. Drew's turnaround at Baylor is considered by many to be one of the best in the history of college sports.

Coaching career

Valparaiso
Drew graduated from Butler University in 1993 with a bachelor's degree in liberal arts. While at Butler he was a member of Delta Tau Delta International Fraternity. Although he never played college basketball at the varsity level, Drew spent two years as a student assistant for the men's basketball team, and also played on the men's tennis team but did not earn a letter.

Afterwards, Drew assumed an assistant coaching position with the Valparaiso University Crusaders men's team under his father Homer Drew. He spent nine years in this position, during which he earned a master's degree from Valparaiso and a reputation as one of the best recruiters in the nation. Once the elder Drew retired, he became the team's head coach for one year. In that year, Valparaiso won the regular-season conference championship, but lost to IUPUI in the Mid-Continent Conference tournament, thus losing the bid to the NCAA tournament. However, the team proceeded to earn an NIT bid. When Drew went to Baylor, his father came out of retirement to coach Valpo.

Baylor
On August 22, 2003, Drew took the head coaching position of the men's team at Baylor University after the resignation of Dave Bliss due to scandal. This was unusually late for a coaching change; practice was only two months away and the season opener was only three months away.

Drew took over a program left in a shambles as a result of the scandal. Nearly every top player from the 2002–03 Bears had transferred after school officials granted a full release to every player on the team. Additionally, Baylor had placed itself on probation until 2005 and withdrawn from postseason play for the 2003–04 season. Drew led a decimated roster to an 8–21 record in his first season.

Shortly after Drew's first season, Baylor extended its self-imposed probation until 2006 and docked itself several scholarships and paid recruiting visits through 2006. The NCAA imposed further sanctions in 2005, extending Baylor's probation until 2010, docking the Bears three paid visits in 2006–07 and banning the Bears from non-conference play in the 2005–06 season. With these handicaps, Drew led the Bears to 9–19 in the 2004–05 season, and 4–13 in the Big 12 Conference-only 2005–06 season.

In the 2007–08 season, Drew turned around his Bears to finish with a 21–9 regular-season record. They finished fourth in the Big 12 with a 9–7 record. The 21 wins and 9 conference wins were Baylor's best since joining the Big 12 in 1996. It was enough to make the NCAA Tournament for only the fifth time in school history and the first time since 1988. At the end of the regular season, when Drew made an appearance on the sports show Pardon The Interruption (PTI), host Tony Kornheiser suggested on the air that Drew be voted "unanimous coach of the year." After the season, Drew signed a 10-year contract extension to stay the head coach of the Bears.

Prior to the 2008–09 season, a Rivals.com writer called Drew the Big 12 "coach on the rise" due to Drew's success in recruiting talent to Baylor. The Big 12 coaches picked Drew's squad to finish fourth in the conference.

In 2010, after finishing tied for second in the Big 12 with a squad picked to finish tenth in the preseason poll, Scott Drew was elected the Austin American Statesman's Coach of the Year. That year he went on to beat the Texas Longhorns three straight times. He went on in the same year to enjoy an NCAA Sweet 16 berth, making him and his father Homer Drew one of the few father and son coaches to accomplish such feat. The team then made it to the Elite 8 before losing to the national championship-winning Duke Blue Devils.

In 2011, Drew led Baylor to an 18–13 overall record and a seventh-place finish in the Big 12. In the first round of the Big 12 tournament, Baylor lost to Oklahoma. Hours before the game, Baylor was informed that star player, Perry Jones III, would not be allowed to play for accepting impermissible benefits, a decision that was later reversed. The team did not participate in a postseason tournament.

In 2011–12, the Bears started the season 17–0 and rose to third in the AP Poll and the coaches' poll—the highest weekly rankings in school history at that time. However, Baylor finished the regular season on an 8–6 run and finished in a tie for third in the Big 12. In the Big 12 tournament, they defeated No. 3-ranked Kansas in the semifinals, but lost to Missouri in the championship game. They received an at-large bid to the NCAA tournament, where they advanced to the Elite Eight before losing to Kentucky. The loss marked the second time in three seasons that the Bears' season ended at the hands of the eventual national champions.

In April 2012, the NCAA put the Baylor men's and women's basketball programs on three years probation and implemented scholarship reductions after an investigation revealed major recruiting violations and impermissible involvement of talent scouts at the basketball clinics they hosted. It was also revealed that one of Drew's assistant coaches had attempted to influence two AAU coaches to provide false and misleading information during the investigation. Drew, who issued a statement accepting full responsibility for the infractions, was cited for failure to monitor the men's program and suspended by the Big 12 for the first two conference games in the 2012–13 season.

During the 2012–13 season, Baylor fell to 23–14, 9–9 in Big 12 play to finish in sixth place. An early loss in the Big 12 tournament resulted in the Bears failing to get an invitation to the NCAA tournament. They accepted a bid to the NIT where they would advance to the championship game and defeat Iowa to win the NIT.

In 2013–14, Drew won his 202nd game at Baylor, vaulting him past Bill Henderson to become the winningest coach in Baylor history. The Bears finished with a 26–12 record, again finishing in sixth place in the Big 12. However, they advanced to the Big 12 tournament championship with three straight wins, including a win over No. 17-ranked Oklahoma, before losing to No. 16-ranked Iowa State. They received an at-large bid to the NCAA tournament as a 6 seed. In the Tournament, the defeated Nebraska and Creighton, before losing to Wisconsin in the Sweet Sixteen.

The following year, the Bears finished 24–10, 11–7 to finish in fourth place in Big 12 play. They lost in the semifinals of the Big 12 tournament to No. 9 Kansas and received an at-large bid to the NCAA tournament. As a No. 3 seed, they were upset by No. 14-seeded Georgia State in the Second Round (formerly the First Round).

A third straight trip to the NCAA tournament followed in 2016, but another early exit followed the Bears 22–12 campaign. An upset by No. 12-seeded Yale knocked the Bears out of the Tournament in the First Round.

In 2016–17, the Bears began the season 15–0 and led to a No. 1 in the country for the first time in Baylor history. However, in their first game as No. 1, they lost to No. 10-ranked West Virginia. Later in the season Baylor would beat West Virginia at home to notch their fourth win over a top 10 team on the season. Baylor was an at-large 3-seed to the NCAA tournament, losing in the Sweet 16.

The 2020-21 Baylor Bears basketball team won the school's first Big 12 regular season title, and first regular season conference title of any sort since 1950. They spent most of the season 2nd in the AP Poll behind Gonzaga. The two teams met in the 2021 NCAA Division I Men's Basketball Championship Game, where the Bears won 86–70 over the previously undefeated Bulldogs for Baylor's first ever national championship.

In 2022, Baylor finished tied with Kansas for first place in the Big 12. The Bears earned a 1 seed in the NCAA tournament but were upset in the round of 32 by UNC.

Personal life
Drew is a Christian and is married to Kelly Drew. The couple have one daughter named Mackenzie and two sons named Peyton and Brody.

Drew's brother, Bryce Drew, is the head coach of the Grand Canyon Antelopes men's basketball team at Grand Canyon University.

Head coaching record

References

External links

Baylor profile

1970 births
Living people
American Christians
American men's basketball coaches
American men's basketball players
Basketball coaches from Missouri
Basketball players from Kansas City, Missouri
Baylor Bears men's basketball coaches
Butler University alumni 
College men's basketball head coaches in the United States
Sportspeople from Kansas City, Missouri
Valparaiso Beacons men's basketball coaches
Valparaiso University alumni